Diego Gonzalo Chaves de Miquelerena (born 14 February 1986 in Buenos Aires) is an Uruguayan professional footballer.

Career

Youth
Chaves is an Uruguayan, but spent most of his childhood in Argentina. From age 12 to 15, he started playing for the smaller divisions of several Argentinian teams: River Plate, Boca Juniors, Platenese, and then again River Plate. At age 16, Chaves moved to Brasil for a year and there he played for Figueirense.

Professional
His professional career began in the year 2004, when he moved to Uruguay and joined Montevideo Wanderers F.C. There he played a total of 93 games in which he scored 27 goals. In July 2009, he received an offer from Querétaro FC and moved to Mexico. With Querétaro he appeared in 15 games and scored 4 goals.

Diego scored his first two goals for Querétaro while playing against Jaguares, with a final score of 2–2. His third goal was against Monterrey, but the team lost the game 3 to 1. In December 2009 he was transferred to Veracruz, a club that was looking to return to the maximum division in Mexico. He returned to Uruguay with Nacional in 2010.

In February 2011, Chaves signed with Chicago Fire of Major League Soccer. He made his debut, and scored his first goal for his new club, 19 March 2011 in Chicago's 1–1 tie with FC Dallas on the opening day of the 2011 MLS season. Chaves went on to score in each of his next two matches, a 3–2 win vs. Sporting Kansas City 26 March 2011 and a 2–1 loss at Seattle Sounders F.C. 9 April 2011 to become the first player in club history to record goals in each of his first three league appearances for the team. Chaves would finish the 2011 campaign with seven goals and three assists across all competitions, helping the team to its first appearance in the Lamar Hunt U.S. Open Cup final since 2006 where they eventually fell 2–0 at Seattle.

A report in the Chilean media on January 15, 2012 claims that the 25-year-old Uruguayan striker has signed with Primera División club Palestino after he and the Fire mutually parted ways. On 2014, Chaves was out on loan to O'Higgins, playing 27 matches and scoring 6 goals in league. In December 2014, he return to Palestino.

Honours

Club
O'Higgins
Supercopa de Chile: 2014

References

External links
 
 

1986 births
Living people
Argentine footballers
Argentine expatriate footballers
Association football forwards
Footballers from Buenos Aires
Montevideo Wanderers F.C. players
Querétaro F.C. footballers
C.D. Veracruz footballers
Club Deportivo Palestino footballers
O'Higgins F.C. footballers
San Luis de Quillota footballers
Club Nacional de Football players
Chicago Fire FC players
San Martín de San Juan footballers
Arsenal de Sarandí footballers
Deportivo Morón footballers
Club Atlético Sarmiento footballers
Uruguayan Primera División players
Chilean Primera División players
Liga MX players
Ascenso MX players
Major League Soccer players
Primera Nacional players
Argentine Primera División players
Argentine expatriate sportspeople in Chile
Argentine expatriate sportspeople in Mexico
Argentine expatriate sportspeople in the United States
Expatriate footballers in Chile
Expatriate footballers in Mexico
Expatriate soccer players in the United States